The 2017 Southeast Asian Haze was a transnational haze crisis that started in late July, 2017. The Singaporean National Environment Agency said in June that the number of hotspots in Sumatra due to farmers using the "slash-and-burn" technique to clear land was 180.

References

See also
 2015 Southeast Asian haze
 2013 Southeast Asian haze

Southeast Asian haze
2017 in Southeast Asia
Environment of Indonesia
Environment of Malaysia
Environment of Singapore